Woggabaliri is claimed to be the name of a traditional Indigenous Australian "co-operative kicking volley game" practiced prior to European settlement of Australia. 

The offices of Sport in New South Wales in 2009 and later Queensland have recognised the game of Woggabiliri as a kicking game played in a group of four to six players in circle which the Australian Sports Council claims that it is related to modern game of soccer. It is claimed that aborigines in areas of the Bogan River and Lachlan River in New South Wales playing it despite no previous records of it and no academic sources. The Office of Sport New South Wales in 2018 claimed that the gameplay involved seeing for how long the ball can be kept in the air before it touches the ground (a direct quote from Blandowski's 1857 account discovered in 2007).

History 

Robert Hamilton Mathews studying aboriginal languages listed the word 'Woggabaliri' in 1901 as the Ngunnawal word for "play". 

References to Woggabaliri as a traditional game played by the Wiradjuri and surrounding peoples before European arrival were first made by segments of the Australian media in 2007 following the discovery of William Blandowski's 1857 engravings depicting traditional aboriginal games near Merbein, Victoria discovered by Dr Patrick Greene, the CEO of Museum Victoria. This engraving is now universally believed to be a depiction of the indigenous game commonly referred to as Marngrook believed by many as antecedent to Australian rules football. It therefore attracted the attention of the rival Association football community in Australia.

Woggabaliri was recognised by the Australian Sports Commission (ASC) in 2009 as one of the oldest Indigenous ball games and the earliest depicted, believed by the ASC to be the subject of William Blandowski's 1857 engraving. In 2010, Football Federation Australia referenced Woggabaliri in its Australian 2022 FIFA World Cup bid citing its similarity to football (soccer) as part of Australia's national heritage. Ken Edwards and Troy Meston (ASC 2009) claim that the word is from the Wiradyuri language however the wiradjuri word for play is 'wagigi'. This error has also since been propagated by other government and non-government sources.   

Author John Maynard in his 2011 book "The Aboriginal Soccer Tribe" claims Woggabaliri as Australia's first football game provides a links to the modern game of Association football however does not provide sources for it.

Indirect accounts 
Almost all claimed accounts of Woggabaliri singly reference the 2007 discovery of Blandowski's work. Since 2009 some sources have claimed that Woggabaliri was a non-competitive game played with a ball made of Bulrush roots wrapped in possum fur where the objective of it is to keep the ball in the air using teamwork and ball control.

Modern play 
In Australia the Laureus Sport for Good Foundation promotes Woggabaliri as one of several Indigenous games available as an addition to traditional school sports. The New South Wales Department of the Arts, Sport and Recreation in 2011 promoted Woggabaliri in New South Wales schools.

Basic rules 
The game as described by Sports NSW can be played by groups of four to six players standing in a circle 2 metres apart and uses either an association football or a volleyball ball. Using feet and knees only, in no set order but without consecutive touches, the players attempt to keep the ball from touching the ground. The group that has the most touches in a set time wins. If the ball touches the ground the count is restarted.

Team rules 
Two teams of four play on a volleyball court sized pitch with football (soccer) goals at each end. A game consists of two-halves lasting 10 minutes each. Players may use feet, knees, thighs, chest and head to keep the ball aloft with the team losing possession if the ball touches the ground, is intercepted or an infringement occurs. Tackling is not permitted, and goals can be scored from any part of the pitch.

See also 

 Marn Grook

References 

Indigenous Australian culture
Cooperative games
Ball games